CME Group Inc., headquartered in Chicago, operates financial derivatives exchanges including the Chicago Mercantile Exchange, Chicago Board of Trade, New York Mercantile Exchange, and The Commodity Exchange. It is the world's largest operator of financial derivatives exchanges. Its exchanges are platforms for trading in agricultural products, currencies, energy, interest rates, metals, futures contracts, options, stock indexes, and cryptocurrencies futures. In 2022, CME Group futures and options had an average daily volume of 23.3 million contracts. Trading is conducted in two methods: an open outcry format and the CME Globex Trading System, an electronic trading platform. The company also owns 27% of S&P Dow Jones Indices.

The company pioneered the CME SPAN software that is used as the official performance bond (margin) mechanism of 50 registered exchanges, clearing organizations, service bureaus, and regulatory agencies.

History
CME was founded in 1898 as a nonprofit corporation. In 1919, it established its clearing house. In 2000, CME demutualized. In 2002, CME Group became a public company via an initial public offering. The company acquired CBOT Holdings in 2007 in an $8 billion stock transaction. The company acquired the New York Mercantile Exchange, owner of both the NYMEX exchange and the Commodity Exchange (COMEX), in 2008.

In 2010, the company acquired a majority stake in Dow Jones Indexes, which was combined with S&P Global’s index business in 2012 to form S&P Dow Jones Indices, of which the company has a 27% ownership stake.

In 2012, the company acquired the Kansas City Board of Trade, the dominant venue for the sale of hard red winter wheat, for $126 million in cash.

In 2018, the company acquired NEX Group for $5.5 billion.

What is Open outcry?
Operating during regular trading hours (RTH), the open outcry method consists of floor traders standing in a trading pit to call out orders, prices, and quantities of a particular commodity or its derivatives. Different colored jackets are worn by the traders to indicate what firm they are a part of. In addition, complex hand signals (called Arb) are used. These hand signals were first used in the 1970s. Today, however, headsets are also used by the brokers to communicate with the traders. The pits are areas of the floor that are lowered to facilitate communication, somewhat like a miniature amphitheater. The pits can be raised and lowered depending on trading volume. To an onlooker, the open outcry system can look chaotic and confusing, but in reality the system is a tried and true method of accurate and efficient trading. An illustrated project to record the hand signal language used in CME's trading pits has been compiled.

Awards and honors 
 In 2019, CME Group was named the world's fastest growing and most valuable exchange brand for the sixth consecutive year by Brand Finance, while it had the fifth greatest brand strength.

 The company was named Exchange of the Year, Clearing House of the Year and Exchange Innovation of the Year in the 2019 Risk Awards. CME Group won in four categories at the FOW International Awards including Global Exchange of the Year, Americas Exchange of the Year, Best New Interest Rates Contract and Proprietary Traders' Exchange of the Year.

 In 2019, CME Group was named to the Forbes list of America's Best Mid-Size Employers.

 CME Group was named to Computerworld's 2019 Best Places to work in IT list.

 In 2019, the company earned a perfect score of 100 on the Human Rights Campaign's Corporate Equality Index.

See also
 CME Group Tour Championship, the season-ending tournament of the LPGA Tour of women's golf, sponsored by CME Group

References

External links

 The CME Group Collections at University of Illinois at Chicago

1898 establishments in Illinois
Chicago Board of Trade
Companies listed on the Nasdaq
Companies formerly listed on the New York Stock Exchange
Companies based in Chicago
 
Derivatives (finance)
Electronic trading platforms
Financial services companies established in 2007
Financial services companies based in Illinois
Futures exchanges
Market data